Witchblade is an American television series that aired on TNT from 2001 to 2002. The series is based on the Witchblade comic book series, and followed a pilot film that debuted in August 2000. Some of the episodes were written by Ralph Hemecker, Marc Silvestri (who also wrote the comic book) and J.D. Zeik.

Yancy Butler starred as Sara Pezzini, Anthony Cistaro as Kenneth Irons, David Chokachi as Jake McCartey, Eric Etebari as Ian Nottingham, Will Yun Lee as Danny Woo, Conrad Dunn as Tommy Gallo, Kenneth Welsh as Joe Siri, and John Hensley as Gabriel Bowman, among others. The show was canceled in September 2002; there was speculation that the cancellation was connected to Butler's entering rehab for alcoholism. Top Cow editor Matt Hawkins said that the series was and remains the highest rated TV series to be cancelled.

The series ran for two seasons on TNT, for a total of 24 episodes (including pilot). The first episode aired June 12, 2001; the last episode aired August 26, 2002. In spite of its cancellation, Witchblade was ranked seventh in the Top 10 Basic Cable Dramas for 2002 (Multichannel News, February 2003).

Cast and characters

Main
 Yancy Butler as Det. Sara "Pez" Pezzini
 David Chokachi as Det. Jake McCartney
 Anthony Cistaro as Kenneth Irons
 Will Yun Lee as Det. Danny Woo
 John Hensley as Gabriel Bowman
 Eric Etebari as Ian Nottingham

Recurring
 Lazar Rockwood as Lazar
 Kathryn Winslow as Vicky Po
 Nestor Serrano as Captain Bruno Dante
 Bill Mcdonald as Jerry Orlinsky
 Kim De Lury as Conchobar
 Johnie Chase as Det. "Jumbo"
 Dov Tiefenbach as Jagger
 Noah Danby as Det. Burgess

Music
The series used song fragments from various artists during the two seasons. Acts like Stabbing Westward, Pump, Michael Kisur, and Suicidal Tendencies were featured in the show soundtrack.

On May 29, 2007, the soundtrack for the series' score was released by composer Joel Goldsmith on his independent record label, FreeClyde.

In 2004, a compilation album, Witchblade the Music, was released on the Edge Artists record label featuring music from/inspired by the Top Cow comic book and the Witchblade TV series. It was compiled and produced by G Tom Mac and Eddie Kislinger.

Episodes

Season 1 (2001)

Season 2 (2002)

Home media
In 2008, Warner Home Video released Witchblade: The Complete Series — a seven-disc collectors set including the original made-for-TV movie, all 24 episodes of the series, and special features — on July 29. For the DVD release the music was altered in many episodes in comparison to the original aired episodes.

Reception
On Rotten Tomatoes season 1 has a rating of 63% based on reviews from 8 critics, 5 of the reviews were positive, 3 of the reviews were negative.
Allan Johnson of The Chicago Tribune praised the show for following seamlessly from the television movie and praising it for translating the cinematic effects to the small screen. Johnson calls it "a nice action series to enjoy in the summer, full of atmospheric characters and situations".

Allan Johnson of The Chicago Tribune gave season 2 a positive review. Johnson notes that although some viewers may be tuning in due to difficulties in Butler's personal life, praises the show for its "sharp visual sense, lurid, high-octane action scenes and a captivating lead in Butler".

References

External links
  from Warner Bros.
  from TNT
 
 
 
 Interview with Yancy Butler
 Jump The Shark - Witchblade
 E! on cancellation

2001 American television series debuts
2002 American television series endings
English-language television shows
Saturn Award-winning television series
American superhero television series
Television shows based on comics
Television series by Warner Bros. Television Studios
Television shows filmed in Toronto
TNT (American TV network) original programming
Witchblade
Television shows based on Top Cow Productions
Fictional portrayals of the New York City Police Department
Television shows set in New York City
Television series based on Image Comics